Manilva is a municipality which lies on the coast at the southwesternmost edge of the province of Málaga on its border with the Province of Cádiz in the autonomous community of Andalusia in Spain. It belongs to the comarca of Costa del Sol Occidental.

History

Manilva's strategic position, close to the entrance to the Mediterranean, has resulted in a long history of settlement in the area going back to the Stone Age. In recent years traces of these early settlers have been found in caves in the Sierra Utrera, a ridge of limestone which runs behind the town. There is also a historically important Bronze Age hill fort which is currently the subject of a programme of excavations by experts from across Europe.

It was during the Roman period, though, that the area first enjoyed prominence, as it was the site of a thriving fish processing industry, which exported products, including the highly prized Garum paste (a kind of “Gentleman’s Relish”) which was in much demand back in Rome. Remains of the factory, a villa and bathhouse can be found today in Castillo de la Duquesa, one of Manilva's coastal villages.

It was in the 16th century that the town of Manilva itself was founded, although a part of the neighbouring municipality of Casares, it gained its independence in 1795 and has grown ever since. For many years the chief industries were fishing, agriculture and viticulture. Manilva's vineyards are famous for their moscatel grapes, used for the production of raisins and fine wines.

Since the 1970s, when the Marina and golf course were built, tourism has been added to this list, and in recent years Manilva has enjoyed the status of one of the Costa del Sol's fastest developing municipalities, with almost a trebling of the resident population in the last 10 years.

Another area of development has been the business sector, with the establishment of an industrial estate just a few hundred metres from the Manilva exit to the A7 motorway, there are also literally hundreds of shops and office units available thanks to the construction boom of recent years.

Local Cultural Festivals and Events

Like all Spanish towns and cities in Andalusia, Manilva has an annual Feria (festival) or fair, which in Manilva's case is held in the second week of August, to coincide with one of Spain's public holiday's, Ascension Day on 15 August.

In fact Manilva has a very busy calendar of ferias and fiestas either religious, traditional or modern. Starting off with the Three Kings cavalcade on 5 January, then the raucous fun of Carnival around the beginning of Lent; the solemn devotion of the Semana Santa processions during Easter; the Manilva International Festival, around the end of May, during which the municipality's international community takes the opportunity to show off its varying culture, cuisine and traditions; Saint John's Eve during the Summer solstice with its pagan tradition of Bonfires of Saint John, fireworks and partying till dawn; the fishermen's celebration of their patron, the Virgen del Carmen in mid-July, and then rounding off the summer with the Vendimia, in the first weekend of September, a festival celebrating Manilva's grape harvest. Throw into that a good smattering of Saints’ days and pilgrimages and you've got a busy schedule of partying and celebrations.

References

External links 
Manilva community website - in English
Manilva Town Hall site - in Spanish
Manilva Property Market and Area Guide - in English and Spanish

Municipalities in the Province of Málaga